Memories of Love is the debut studio album by American indie pop band Future Bible Heroes, released in 1997 in the U.S., the U.K., Europe and Korea.  Its accompanying booklet features twelve word puzzles and games that, if solved correctly, reveal the name of the band and the title of the album, plus the lyrics to each of the album's eleven songs.

Track listing

Personnel 
Future Bible Heroes
 Stephin Merritt – vocals
 Claudia Gonson – vocals
 Christopher Ewen – instrumentation

References 

1997 debut albums
Future Bible Heroes albums
Rykodisc albums